The University of Papua is a university in the province of West Papua, Indonesia. It has three campuses: Manokwari, Sorong, and Raja Ampat.The university teaches Economics, Forestry, Agriculture and Earth Sciences.

History
The university was founded on November 3, 2000. Previously, it was part of the Faculty of Agriculture of Cendrawasih University, based in Jayapura.

Faculties
The university consists of 13 faculties:  
 Faculty of Agriculture - Dean: Dr. Ir. Agus I. Sumule 
 Faculty of Forestry - Dean: Ir. Bernardus B. Rettob 
 Faculty of Animal Husbandry - Dean: Prof. Dr. Ir. Budi Santoso, MP 
 Faculty of Mathematics and Natural Science - Dean: Dr. Drs. Bimo B. Santoso 
 Faculty of Economics and Business - Dean: Dr. Ir. Achmad Rochani 
 Faculty of Letters and Culture - Dean: Andreas J. Deda.
 Faculty of Agricultural Technology - Dean: Dr. Zita L. Sarungallo, S.TP., M.Si.
 Faculty of Fisheries and Maritime Studies - Dean: Ir. Mudji Rahayu, M.Si.
 Faculty of Engineering - Dean: Elias K. Bawan, ST, M.Eng.
 Faculty of Teaching and Education Science - Dean: Jan H. Nunaki, S.Pd., M.Si.
 Faculty of Social and Political studies - Dean: Dr. Hugo Warami, S.Pd., M.Hum (plt)
 Faculty of Medicine - Dean: Dr. Ir. Sintje Rumetor, MP (plt)
 Faculty of Mining and Petroleum Technology - Dean: Yulius G. Pangkung, S.T., M.Si.

References

External links
 Universitas Negeri Papua

Universities in West Papua (province)
Manokwari
Western New Guinean culture
Indonesian state universities
2000 establishments in Indonesia
Educational institutions established in 2000